Sabas (439–532), in Church parlance Saint Sabas or Sabbas the Sanctified, was a Cappadocian Greek monk, priest and saint, who was born in Cappadocia and lived mainly in Palaestina Prima. He was the founder of several convents, most notably the one known as Mar Saba, in Palestine. The saint's name is derived from  Sabbāʾ "old man".

Life

Early life
St Sabbas was born the son of John, a military commander, and Sophia, at Moutalaske near Caesarea of Cappadocia. The name of the village has no known meaning in Greek, but the Aramaic "Mata la zkha" translates as "Village of Victory".

Journeying to Alexandria on military matters, his parents left their five-year-old son in the care of an uncle. When the boy reached eight years of age, he entered the nearby monastery of Bishop Flavian of Antioch. The gifted child quickly learned to read and became an expert on the Holy Scriptures. Sabbas resisted his parents' pressure to return to the world and enter into marriage. When he was 17 years old he received monastic tonsure and subsequently spent ten years at the monastery of Bishop Flavian.

Holy Land: apprenticeship
After that, Sabbas went to Jerusalem, and from there to the monastery of Saint Euthymius the Great. But Euthymius sent Sabbas to Abba Theoctistus, the head of a nearby monastery with a strict cenobitic rule. Sabbas lived in obedience at this monastery until the age of thirty.

After the death of the Elder Theoctistus, his successor blessed Sabbas to seclude himself in a cave. On Saturdays, however, he left his hermitage and came to the monastery, where he participated in divine services and ate with the brethren. After a certain time Sabbas received permission not to leave his hermitage at all, and he lived in isolation in the cave for five years.

Euthymius attentively directed the life of the young monk, and seeing his spiritual maturity, he began to take him to the wilderness with him. They set out each January 14 and remained there until Palm Sunday. Euthymius called Sabbas a child-elder, and encouraged him to grow in the monastic virtues.

Hermit, founder of monasteries, Church leader
When Euthymius died (c. 473), Sabbas withdrew from the lavra (a cluster of cells or caves for hermits, with a church and sometimes a refectory at the center) and moved to a cave near the monastery of St Gerasimus of the Jordan. After several years, disciples began to gather around Sabbas, seeking the monastic life. As the number of monks increased, the Great Lavra sprang up. The traditional dating of the founding of this lavra in the Kidron Valley, south of Jerusalem, is 484. Because some of his monks opposed his rule and demanded a priest as their abbot, the opposition continued and he withdrew to the New Lavra which he had built near Thekoa. In the lavras the young monks lived a cenobitic life, but the elders a semi-eremitical one, each in his own hut within the precincts of the lavra, attending only the solemn church services.

As a supporter of the Chalcedonian creed and strenuous opponent of the Monophysites and the Origenists, he tried to influence the emperors against them by calling personally on Emperor Anastasios I at Constantinople in 511 and on Justinian I in 531.

Sabbas founded several more monasteries. It is claimed that many miracles took place through the prayers of Sabbas: at the lavra a spring of water welled up, during a time of drought they received abundant rain, and there were also healings of the sick and the possessed.

Patriarch Salustius of Jerusalem ordained him in 491 and appointed him archimandrite of all the monasteries in Palaestina Prima in 494. Sabbas composed the first monastic rule of church services, the so-called Jerusalem Typikon, for guidance of all the Byzantine monasteries. He died in the year 532. His feast day is on 5 December.

Relics

Sabbas's relics were taken by Crusaders in the 12th century as a result of the War of Saint Sabas and remained in Italy in the Church of Saint Anthony in Venice, until Pope Paul VI returned them to the monastery in 1965 as a gesture of good will towards the Orthodox.

Vita and scholarship
Sabbas's Life was written by his disciple Cyril of Scythopolis. Kongregationen (1907), i, §10.

Legacy
His Great Lavra long continued to be the most influential monastery in those parts, and produced several distinguished monks, among them St John of Damascus. It is now known as the monastery of Mar Saba. The church of San Saba in Rome is dedicated to him.

The San Saba River in Texas, and other features in the area, are named after Sabbas; it was so called because Juan Antonio Bustillo y Ceballos discovered the river on St. Sabbas's day, 5 December 1732, and named it Río de San Sabá de las Nueces ("River of Saint Sabbas of the Walnuts").

See also
Anthony the Great (c. 251 – 356), monk who established Christian monasticism in the Egyptian desert
Chariton the Confessor (end of 3rd century - ca. 350), founder of lavra-type monasticism in the Judaean desert
Euthymius the Great (377–473), founder of monasteries in Palestine and saint
Saint Sabbas the Sanctified, patron saint archive
Sabbas (disambiguation) including Saint Sabbas, Saint Sabas, Saint Sava
Saint Sava (1169/74–1236), Serbian prince and Orthodox monk who visited Mar Saba

References

Bibliography

External links

St. Sabbas the Sanctified Greek Orthodox Archdiocese of Australia
St Sabbas the Sanctified Orthodox Icon and Synaxarion (December 5)
Patron Saints Index: Saint Sabbas

439 births
532 deaths
5th-century Byzantine monks
6th-century Byzantine monks
Byzantine saints
Saints from the Holy Land
Saints from Anatolia
6th-century Christian saints
Byzantine Cappadocians
People from Talas, Turkey